Ameena Saiyid   is the current managing director of Oxford University Press (OUP) in Pakistan. She became the head of OUP Pakistan in 1988, becoming the first woman to ever head a multinational company in Pakistan.  In 2005, she became the first Pakistani woman to be awarded the Order of the British Empire for her services to women’s rights, education, and intellectual property rights in Pakistan, and to Anglo-Pakistan relations. She is also the founder of the Karachi Literature Festival. In February 2013, she was conferred the prestigious French award of Knight of the Order of Arts and Letters for her work in promoting literary culture. She attended Karachi Grammar School.

Career
Saiyid taught at Lahore American School before joining Oxford University Press in 1979. She joined OUP in Lahore and served in various capacities before leaving in 1986 to launch her own publishing house, Saiyid Books. In 1988, she rejoined as its chief executive. After 30 years with Oxford University Press (OUP) Pakistan, Ms Ameena Saiyid, OBE has announced her retirement in December 2018.

Other activities
In 2009, she became a member of the Federal Investigation Agency Advisory Committee on IPR Enforcement.

In April 2010, she became the first woman elected to be president of the 150-year-old Overseas Investors Chamber of Commerce and Industry (OICCI), after serving as its vice president in 2009–2010, which was also a first for a woman.

References

Living people
Officers of the Order of the British Empire
Pakistani chief executives
Pakistani businesspeople
Oxford University Press people
Chevaliers of the Ordre des Arts et des Lettres
Karachi Grammar School alumni
Year of birth missing (living people)
Recipients of Sitara-i-Imtiaz